Lehlomela George Ramabele (born 14 April 1992) is a Mosotho footballer who plays for Botswana Defence Force XI as a striker. He played for Lesotho internationals at the 2014 FIFA World Cup qualifiers.

International career

International goals
Scores and results list Lesotho's goal tally first.

References 

1992 births
Living people
Association football forwards
Lesotho footballers
Lesotho expatriate footballers
Lesotho international footballers
Expatriate footballers in Botswana
Lesotho expatriate sportspeople in Botswana
Botswana Defence Force XI F.C. players